Dennis Joseph Mills (born July 19, 1946) is a Canadian businessman and former politician. He was a Liberal Member of Parliament for the riding of Toronto—Danforth in the east-end of downtown Toronto. From February 2012 until November 2016, Mills was a member of the board of directors of Pacific Rubiales Energy Corp and from April 2013 until the present he has been a director on the board of CGX Energy Inc. Mills is currently the President and CEO of Toronto Partners Inc. and is also founder of Racing Future Inc. where he is currently President and CEO.

Mills has long conducted business in Toronto. In the 1988, 1993, 1997 and 2000 general elections, he won re-election to the House of Commons in the Danforth area of Toronto. In 1993, Mills was inducted into the Order of St. Michael

Biography

The early years
Mills served on the personal staff of Prime Minister Pierre Trudeau from 1980 until 1984, when Trudeau was succeeded as Liberal leader and prime minister by John Turner. Mills ran as the Liberal candidate in Broadview-Greenwood in the 1988 election in which the Progressive Conservative government of Brian Mulroney was re-elected, defeating New Democratic Party incumbent Lynn McDonald over the issue of support for the Meech Lake Accord, which Mills opposed.

With the Liberal Party in opposition, Mills served as parliamentary critic for entrepreneurship and small business. When the Liberal Party, under the leadership of Jean Chrétien, formed the government following the 1993 election, he served as Parliamentary Secretary to the Minister of Industry from 1993 to 1996. He then served as chair of the House of Commons Sub-Committee on Sports and vice-chair of the House of Commons Standing Committee on Canadian Heritage.

In 1996, he briefly left the Liberal caucus to sit as an "Independent Liberal", protesting the government's failure to abolish the Goods and Service Tax as it had promised in the 1993 campaign. Following Chrétien's resignation as Liberal leader, Mills publicly considered running to succeed Chrétien at the 2003 leadership convention and agitated against a "coronation" for front runner Paul Martin, but he did not end up standing for the leadership.

He is best known for helping to organize large events in Toronto. These include World Youth Day in 2002 that brought Pope John Paul II to Toronto, and the post-SARS Rolling Stones concert in 2003. In 1989, Mills organized the Summit on the Environment in Toronto, which attracted approximately 50,000 people and performers such as John Denver and Gordon Lightfoot. In 2001, with the Assembly of First Nations, Mills organized and co-chaired the Bala Summit on Water (See http://dennismills.com/water-manifesto/), attended by leading experts from Canada and the United States.

Starting in 1999, Mills initiated events for the Family Farm Tribute (See http://dennismills.com/family-farm-tribute/) to recognize the contributions of Canadian family farms.

Waterfront Dreams
He has long been involved in the rebuilding plans for the Toronto waterfront. He was responsible for the creation of the Toronto Port Authority and is still one of its greatest proponents, though he opposes the proposed bridge to the island airport designed by the Port Authority. In 2004, Mills unveiled his plan for the Toronto Waterfront, which includes a campus of the United Nations University for Peace, as well as an aquarium, plenty of greenspace, affordable housing, and new sporting facilities. Funding for the University campus was promised on May 20, 2004 by the federal government, but only $3 million, which will not be sufficient. This was part of $125 million re-announced by Paul Martin in funding for the other recommendations in the project. This is smaller than the $325 million promised in the 1997 election and the $300 million promised in the 2000 election, of which of less than $10 million was ever actually delivered.

He was considered by many to be an opponent of Toronto mayor David Miller. He was at first a supporter of John Nunziata in the 2003 mayoral election, but then switched his support to John Tory, who had become one of the leading candidates.

In 2003, he promised in writing to resign in thirty days if an abandoned property known as the Gatekeeper Squat was not turned into community housing. This was, in Mills words, "to avoid a riot" between the Ontario Coalition Against Poverty and the police.

Shortly before the month's end, a compromise deal to convert the property into interim housing was reached. Many protested that the house was not converted into public housing by the end of the 30 days and thus felt the issue had been exploited, but supporters of Mills claim that it would have been impossible to do so much in so little time, and that the weather at the time, which went as low as -30 degrees Celsius, made conversion of a building impossible. The building is still set to be converted into social housing.

Mills was regularly labelled by opponents one of the most socially conservative members of the Liberal caucus. He was opposed to same-sex marriage, a position unpopular in the strongly left-wing riding of Toronto–Danforth. His defeat was a high priority of gay rights groups in the 2004 election. That said, he did favour civil unions, and stated he would respect any decision derived from a free vote on the issue in the House of Commons. He is personally opposed to abortion rights, but does not and has never opposed or raised debate regarding the issue or abortion laws. These social views are commonly associated with his Roman Catholic faith.

Mills is noted for having advocated what opponents call a flat tax, which he calls a "single tax", about which he wrote two books, A Life Less Taxingand The Single Tax. His other published book is Developing an Agenda for the 21st Century.

In 2001, he was criticized for spending $330,884 on travel and office expenses, more than any other Liberal Member of Parliament (MP). Mills was always among the top of the MP rankings on office expenses, which he was sometimes congratulated and sometimes criticized for. In 2004, he was voted Best Constituency MP by the Ottawa Hill Times. Mills' constituency office on Danforth Avenue took thousands of constituent cases, in such matters as immigration and citizenship, and won numerous awards.

The name of the electoral district was changed in 2000 to "Toronto—Danforth" on the suggestion of Mills. The reasoning behind this was that Mills believed that "Broadview--Greenwood" was confusing on a federal scale, and because the NDP had registered a web address for Broadview—Greenwood.

2004 election loss and retirement from public life
In the 2004 election, Mills was defeated in a close race by New Democratic Party leader and former city councilor Jack Layton in the Toronto—Danforth riding, placing a strong second with nearly 20,000 votes, ahead of Green Party leader Jim Harris and Conservative candidate Loftus Cuddy. One of the major issues of the campaign was the fate of the Toronto waterfront and Mills' public support for the highly controversial Toronto Port Authority.

After the election, Mills re-joined Magna International where he served as CEO and Vice-Chairman of MI Developments with responsibility for all of the company's global real estate assets including all North American Thoroughbred racetracks. Mills retired from MI Developments in 2011.

From February 2012 until November 2016, Mills was on the board of directors of Pacific Rubiales Energy Corp. He was on the board of Hut8 Mining until December 2020. He is also a Director at CGX Energy Inc (April 2013 – Present).

Mills is the founder and president and CEO of Racing Future Inc, a portal for the global community dedicated to re-building and growing the sport of horse racing.

Mills has a wife, Vicki, and four children, Jennifer, Craig, Stephanie, and Andrea. They continue to reside in the Toronto-Danforth riding.

References

External links

1946 births
Businesspeople from Toronto
Canadian Roman Catholics
Independent Liberal MPs in Canada
Liberal Party of Canada MPs
Living people
Members of the House of Commons of Canada from Ontario
Politicians from Toronto
21st-century Canadian politicians